Medway is a village in the Southern Highlands of New South Wales, Australia, in Wingecarribee Shire. It was formerly known as Village of Medway.

At the 2021 census, there were 143 people residing at Medway.

References 

Towns of the Southern Highlands (New South Wales)
Wingecarribee Shire